The Belgium women's national cricket team is the national team of Belgium. It is governed by the Belgian Cricket Federation and takes part in international cricket competitions. As of 2013, it has never participated in any European Championships and never qualified for a World Cup.

In April 2018, the International Cricket Council (ICC) granted full Women's Twenty20 International (WT20I) status to all its members. Therefore, all Twenty20 matches played between Belgium women and another international side after 1 July 2018 will be a full WT20I.

Women's Cricket World Cup

Records and statistics
International Match Summary — Belgium Women
 
Last updated 26 September 2021

Twenty20 International 

T20I record versus other nations

Records complete to WT20I #980. Last updated 26 September 2021.

References

External links
 Website of the Belgian Cricket Federation

Women's national cricket teams
Women's national sports teams of Belgium
Cricket in Belgium